The Battle of Ajnadayn was fought in July or August 634 (Jumada I or II, 13 AH), in a location close to Beit Guvrin in present-day Israel; it was the first major pitched battle between the Byzantine (Roman) Empire and the army of the Arab Rashidun Caliphate. The result of the battle was a decisive Muslim victory. The details of this battle are mostly known through Muslim sources, such as the ninth-century historian al-Waqidi.

Sources
Regarding the primary sources, there is an absence of any of Byzantine provenance; possibly, according to Walter Kaegi, because what Byzantine material exists may conflate the battle with other Byzantine defeats, such as Dathin and Yarmouk. The earliest source appears to be an entry in the Frankish Chronicle of Fredegar, compiled in 658-660, unless this is a possible interpolation.

Background
According to David Nicolle, the Rashidun army left the capital Medina probably in the autumn of 633, but possibly at the beginning of 634. They first engaged and defeated the Byzantines at Dathin on February 4; after that Emperor Heraclius, then stationed in Emesa, had reinforcements sent south to protect Caesarea Maritima. As a possible reaction, commander Khalid ibn al-Walid was ordered to interrupt operations against the Sassanian Empire and reach Syria, which brought him to engage and defeat the Byzantine-allied Ghassanids by April 24, permitting him to enter almost unopposed in Bosra. At this point, Khalid converged with several armies, led by generals such as Abu Ubaydah ibn al-Jarrah, Yazid ibn Abi Sufyan, Amr ibn al-As and Shurahbil ibn Hasana.

Khalid united with Amr's forces in a place known traditionally as Ajnadayn. The site is placed by the Muslim literary sources somewhere between Ramla and Bayt Jibrin (modern Beit Guvrin), both in modern Israel, but is otherwise unattested by any geographer of the period. Based on the region's topography, the historian N. A. Miednikoff suggested that the battle was fought on the Wadi al-Samt river (Valley of Elah), where lies the twin village of al-Jannaba. According to the hypothesis advanced by Miednikoff and Michael Jan de Goeje and summarized by Leone Caetani, it was from the dual form (al-Jannabatayn) of the village the historical name of the battle emerged, by conflation with the plural for "army", ajnad.

Opposing forces
Regarding the strength of the confronting armies, H. A. R. Gibb in the Encyclopaedia of Islam argues that, at best, both forces were made up of 10,000 men, and that the numbers offered in the Muslim sources are "highly exaggerated", especially as regards the Byzantines. David Morray in the Oxford Companion to Military History, however, places both armies at approximately 20,000 strong.

The Byzantines were led by Heraclius' brother Theodore, as well as by a figure called "Artabun" or "Wardan" in the Muslim sources, evidently a corruption of the Armenian name Vardan. The Muslim sources name him as the patrikios (commander) of Emesa, which was the major Byzantine base of operations in Syria in the early period of the Muslim conquests. According to Kaegi, he possibly commanded fresh reinforcements from the north, including Armenians, or from the army that had accompanied Heraclius to Syria. In addition, the army may have also contained local Arab tribal levies. The Arab army consisted of three separate contingents, with either Khalid or, less likely, Amr, as the overall commander.

Battle 
According to George Nafziger, the details of the battle are not detailed specifically, except a Rashidun commander named Dhiraar ibn al-Azwar performed awesome feats during the Battle of Ajnadayn, where he slew so many Byzantine champions by his own hands, including two provincial governors. 

The Byzantines suffered a heavy defeat and were forced to retreat to Damascus. The Arabs suffered heavy casualties, and Muslim tradition records several lists of Companions of Muhammad, including several members of the early Muslim aristocracy, who fell in the battle and were regarded as martyrs. In the battle, female warrior Khawlah bint al-Azwar fought against a Byzantine battation with the armor of a knight. The high number of deaths served to reinvigorate the sense of religious martyrdom among the nascent Muslim community, while the high proportion of Meccan deaths served as a useful counterbalance to the influence of the Medinan Ansar. On the Byzantine side, the Muslim sources report that one of the two commanders, probably Vardan, fell in the battle, but that Theodore escaped and withdrew north where Heraclius replaced him with Vahan and Theodore Trithyrius and sent him to imprisonment in Constantinople.

Aftermath 
Heraclius himself withdrew from Emesa to the greater safety of Antioch after Ajnadayn, while the surviving Byzantine units fled to the safety of walled towns, and left the countryside undefended before the Muslim raids. The whole of Palestine was thus left open to Muslim raids, especially in the interior parts away from the coastal towns. As a result, panic spread across the region, and large numbers of the rural population also sought safety behind the town walls. After their victory, the Arab army once more broke up into several raiding columns, with Amr capturing the interior towns of Nablus (Neapolis), Sabastiya (Sebastia), al-Ludd (Diospolis), Yibna, Amwas (Emmaus-Nicopolis) and Bayt Jibrin (Eleutheropolis) and the coastal town of Yafa (Jaffa). Most of these localities surrendered after token resistance due to the flight of Byzantine troops. The Arab columns reunited once more to confront another Byzantine attempt at halting the Muslim invasion at the Battle of Fahl (near Pella in modern Jordan) six months later.

References

Bibliography
 
 
 
 

634
Ajnadayn
630s in the Byzantine Empire
Ajnadayn
Ajnadayn
Ajnadayn
Ajnadayn
Muslim conquest of the Levant
Medieval Palestine
Valley of Elah